Louis Noël (ne: Hubert Louis-Noël; Saint-Omer, April 1, 1839 - Paris, 1925) was a French sculptor. After studying at the École nationale supérieure des Beaux-Arts under François Jouffroy, Noël became a productive artist, exhibiting regularly. His busts, statues, and portraits were of historical figures, saints, and contemporary people. He created several notable portrait-medallions: Abbe Derguesse (1867; bronze), Mme L. B (1869, silver), Abbe Binet (1873, silver), President Quenson (1875), and M. B (1877).  Noël was the stepfather of the sculptor Jules Déchin (1869-1947).

Partial works
 Basilica of Notre-Dame de Boulogne:  Statue de Monseigneur Lobbedey, Statue de sainte Ide, Statues de la Vierge et de Saint Jean
 Portrait de l'abbé d'Halluin (1896)
 Statue de Saint Pierre Fourier (1899)
 Cénotaphe (1921)

References

External links
 
 St Peter Fourier statue ‒ Founder Statue in St Peter's Basilica

1839 births
1925 deaths
20th-century French sculptors
19th-century French sculptors
French male sculptors
19th-century French male artists